is a former Japanese football player. He played for Japan national team.

Club career
Hara was born on December 21, 1943. After graduating from high school, he joined Yawata Steel (later Nippon Steel). He retired in 1974. He played 96 games and scored 9 goals in the league.

National team career
On July 31, 1970, Hara debuted for Japan national team against Hong Kong. He also played in the 1970 Asian Games. He played five games for Japan in 1970.

National team statistics

References

External links
 
 Japan National Football Team Database

1943 births
Living people
Japanese footballers
Japan international footballers
Japan Soccer League players
Nippon Steel Yawata SC players
Footballers at the 1970 Asian Games
Association football defenders
Asian Games competitors for Japan